The World Series of Rock was a recurring, day-long multi-act summer rock concert held at Cleveland Stadium in Cleveland, Ohio from 1974 through 1980. Belkin Productions staged these events, attracting popular hard rock bands and as many as 88,000 fans.  FM rock radio station WMMS sponsored the concerts.  Attendance was by general admission.

The World Series of Rock was known not only for its arena rock spectacle, but was also notorious for the rowdiness, rampant drug use and drunkenness of the crowd. As a result, concertgoers occasionally fell—or jumped—off the steep stadium upper deck onto the concrete seating area far below, causing serious injury. The Cleveland Free Clinic staffed aid stations in the stadium with physicians, nurses and other volunteers, and through 1977, made its treatment statistics public. From 1978, Belkin Productions conditioned its funding of the Free Clinic on the Clinic's nondisclosure of the number of Clinic staff on duty at the concerts, the nature of conditions treated, and quantity of patients treated.

Cleveland Stadium was the home field of the Cleveland Indians baseball team, so Belkin could only schedule stadium concerts for dates when the Indians were playing out of town. Stadium officials allowed seating on the playing field, which required fixing the turf before the Indians returned home. The fourth concert of 1975 was followed by heavy rain the next day, leaving the field in poor condition for the remainder of the season. Following the 1975 football season, groundskeepers completely resurfaced the field, and installed a drainage system, to repair damage from the rock concerts. The first concert of 1976 was scheduled for July 11 with Aerosmith, Todd Rundgren's Utopia, Jeff Beck (with the Jan Hammer Group) and Derringer. However, the concert was canceled after stadium officials refused to allow seating on the field to prevent damage to the new turf and Aerosmith would not play without fans on the field. No concerts took place at Cleveland Stadium in 1976 though Belkin resumed the series in 1977 after stadium groundskeepers employed a field-covering system consisting of plywood and outdoor carpeting.

The third concert of the 1978 season featuring Fleetwood Mac, originally scheduled for August 5, had to be canceled at the last minute due to a sudden illness suffered by Lindsey Buckingham. The rest of the band, Mick Fleetwood, John McVie, Christine McVie and Stevie Nicks, flew to Cleveland to hold a press conference to explain the cancellation. The concert was rescheduled for August 26, forcing the cancellation of the fourth World Series of Rock featuring Bob Seger and the Silver Bullet Band, Todd Rundgren and Utopia, Blue Öyster Cult and the Cars that was originally scheduled for that date.

Violence outside the stadium marred the July 28, 1979 concert. There were five shootings (including one fatality), dozens of robberies and numerous incidents of violence around the stadium in the early morning hours before the concert, where thousands of fans waited overnight. The next concert featuring Foreigner, Kansas, the Cars, the Tubes, David Johansen and Breathless was originally slated for Sunday, August 19, 1979. At the request of city officials, the concert was rescheduled to Saturday night at 8:00 pm for security reasons, but after receiving many complaints from parents about the late ending time, Belkin canceled the concert. Afterwards, Art Modell, the head of Stadium Corp., stated there would be no more World Series of Rock concerts held at the stadium.

One final World Series of Rock concert, headlined by Bob Seger, took place on July 19, 1980. The ticket price was $12.50.

Cleveland Stadium was demolished in 1996, and replaced with FirstEnergy Stadium built on the same site. County Stadium in Milwaukee, Wisconsin staged its own series of rock festivals, also called the World Series of Rock, in the early 1980s. Since then, "World Series of Rock" has become a generic term for multi-act concerts.

Concert lineups
June 23, 1974
The Beach Boys
Joe Walsh and Barnstorm
Lynyrd Skynyrd
REO Speedwagon

August 4, 1974
Emerson, Lake & Palmer
Climax Blues Band
James Gang

August 31, 1974
Crosby, Stills, Nash & Young
Santana
The Band
Jesse Colin Young

May 31, 1975
The Beach Boys
Chicago

June 14, 1975
The Rolling Stones (featuring Billy Preston)
Tower of Power
The J. Geils Band
Joe Vitale's Madmen

July 11, 1975
Yes
Joe Walsh
Michael Stanley Band
Ace

August 23, 1975
Rod Stewart and Faces
Uriah Heep
Aerosmith
Blue Öyster Cult
Mahogany Rush

June 5, 1977
Ted Nugent
Todd Rundgren's Utopia
Nazareth
Southside Johnny and the Asbury Jukes

June 25, 1977
Pink Floyd

August 6, 1977
Peter Frampton
Bob Seger and the Silver Bullet Band
The J. Geils Band
Derringer

July 1, 1978
The Rolling Stones
Kansas
Peter Tosh

July 15, 1978
Electric Light Orchestra
Foreigner
Journey
Trickster

August 26, 1978
Fleetwood Mac
Bob Welch
The Cars
Todd Rundgren and Utopia
Eddie Money

July 28, 1979
Aerosmith
Ted Nugent
Journey
Thin Lizzy
AC/DC
Scorpions

July 19, 1980
Bob Seger and the Silver Bullet Band
The J. Geils Band
Eddie Money
Def Leppard

Footnotes

Further reading
Wolff, Carlo, Cleveland Rock & Roll Memories: True and Tall Tales of the Glory Days, Told By Musicians, DJs, Promoters & Fans Who Made the Scene in the '60s, '70s, and '80s, Gray & Company, Publishers (2006), . 
Hanson, Debbie, "Jules Belkin - Making Cleveland Rock" (2004).

External links
Murray Saul and Shelly Stile of WMMS open a World Series of Rock show in 1975  , retrieved from www.youtube.com on August 10, 2008.

AC/DC perform at World Series of Rock concert of July 28, 1979 , retrieved from www.youtube.com on March 29, 2009.

Biography of Mike Belkin, principal of Belkin Productions. 

Rock concerts
20th century in Cleveland
Recurring events established in 1974
Music of Cleveland